The Bombardier MOVIA C951 is the first generation electric multiple unit rolling stock in operation on the Downtown Line of Singapore's Mass Rapid Transit (MRT) system. The contract was won by Bombardier Transportation and the rolling stock was built by Changchun Bombardier Railway Vehicles (joint venture of Bombardier Transportation and CNR/CRRC Changchun) Initially, the authorities has ordered 73 trains, although LTA had ordered an additional 15 trains and a final 4 more trains under C951A which makes a total of 92 trainsets were manufactured under C951.

Tender 
The tender for trains under the contract turnkey 951 was closed in June 2008. The tender results was published on Nov 2008.

Note: Awarded amount to Bombardier as announced by LTA is at S$570.7 million, due to exercise of an option for medium frequency auxiliary inverters

History 
73 trainsets consisting of three cars each were purchased at a cost of approximately S$570.7 million for passenger service. Bombardier beat Alstom, Kawasaki Heavy Industries and Hyundai Rotem in the tendering process as the lowest cost offered. The tender for trains under the contract turnkey 951 was closed in June 2008, and awarded in November 2008.

Land Transport Authority later placed an additional order of 15 trainsets in 2013 at an approximate value of $119.2 million. LTA had increased the variation order from 15 to 19, therefore bringing the total trainsets to 92. A partial number of the total fleet operates on the Stage 1 of Downtown Line since 22 December 2013. All 92 trains had completed their manufacturing in Changchun Bombardier Railway Vehicles factory, with some of them awaiting for their delivery into Singapore by mid-2017.

Delivery
These trains were delivered until 2017. They are currently stabled at Gali Batu Depot, Kim Chuan Depot, Tai Seng Facility Building and the future East Coast Integrated Depot.

On 12 October 2012, the first of 11 trains for the Downtown Line Stage 1 arrived at Jurong Port and transported to Kim Chuan Depot to undergo testing by LTA before it is handed over to SBS Transit.

By 28 February 2013, Bombardier had delivered nine of the 11 trains for Downtown Line Stage 1. LTA together with the operator, SBS Transit conducted the necessary tests to ensure safety standards, functional performance and systems compatibility requirements are met before revenue service of the DTL1 which began on 22 December 2013.

Features

Design
The C951 trains include several features that were not seen in existing trains.

New features include:
 an ergonomic seat profile;
 red reserved seats, which allows for clearer separation between normal and reserved seats;
 perch seats, replacing the two-seaters at the ends of the car

The train will also retain existing features like having three rows of poles and hand grips, and vertical poles which split into three at the center.

Dynamic Route Map Display
The Dynamic Route Map Display (DRMD) is a rail travel information system, newly introduced and developed for the C951 trains. The dynamic route map display panels provide commuters with their journey status updates and route information. It also indicates which side the doors will open on. The C830C and the C751C feature the same DRMD.

Bombardier has announced their intention to upgrade the DRMD from the current LED system to an LCD system, to accommodate future extensions to the Downtown line.

Platform Gap Width Reduction
The train doors have a frangible gap made of rubber that protrudes out. The platform-train gap will then be reduced from 75 to 40 mm, preventing passenger accidents due to the platform gap.

LCD Displays
C951 trains are also equipped with LCD Displays at each carriage, with a total of 18 LCD Displays on each train. They show advertisements, movie trailers and informercials related to the Downtown Line.

Automatic Track Inspection (ATI)
Four of the C951 trains also have their bogies installed with the ATI, which is a system of cameras, lasers, and sensors installed on trains that help to detect defects like rail cracks or missing fasteners.

Train formation
The configuration of a C951 trainset in revenue service is DM1–T–DM2, permanently coupled. D stands for "driver's desk", M for "motor" and T for "trailer".

The car numbers of the trains range from 9001x to 9092x where x depends on the carriage type. For example, set 9003 consists of cars 90031 (DM1), 90032 (T), and 90033 (DM2).

References

External links

 MOVIA metro cars for Singapore Downtown Line

Mass Rapid Transit (Singapore) rolling stock
Bombardier Transportation multiple units
Train-related introductions in 2013
750 V DC multiple units
CRRC multiple units